The Lockheed Constellation was used by dozens of airlines and militaries around the world. In military service, the Navy/Air Force EC-121 Warning Star variant remained operational until 1978, nearly 40 years after work on the L-049 began.

♠ Original operators

Commercial
Lockheed built 856 planes. Civilian airlines that operated the Constellation included:

 Aerolíneas Carreras
 Aerotransportes Entre Ríos - AER
 Trans Atlántica Argentina
 Transcontinental ♠

 Qantas ♠

 Aero Transport

 Sabena

 Panair do Brasil
 Real Transportes Aéreos ♠
 Varig ♠

 Nordair ♠
 Trans Canada Airlines ♠ (Now Air Canada)

 Air Ceylon

 Transportes Aéreos Squella
 (Taiwan)
 China Airlines

 Avianca ♠
 LANZA

 Cubana de Aviación ♠

 Aerolineas Mundo S.A.-AMSA
 Aerotours Dominicana
 Aerovías Quisqueyana

 Air France ♠ 
 CATAIR - Compagnie d'Affretements et de Transports Aeriens

 Lufthansa ♠

 Air Haiti International

 Air India ♠

 Aer Lingus ♠
 
 El Al ♠

 Air Afrique

 Korean National Airlines (Now Korean Air)

 Luxair

 Aeronaves de México (Now Aeromexico)
 Aerovias Guest ♠

 Royal Air Maroc

 KLM ♠

 Pakistan International Airlines

 AFISA - Aero Fletes Internacionales SA
 Líneas Aéreas de Panama

 Lloyd Aéreo Paraguayo

 LANSA
 Perú Internacional - COPISA
 Trans-Peruana

 Transportes Aéreos Portugueses (TAP) ♠

 Government of Senegal

 South African Airways ♠
 Trek Airways

 Iberia ♠ 

 Thai Airways Company ♠

 ACE Freighters
 British Overseas Airways Corporation
 Britannia Airways
 Euravia
 Falcon Airways
 Trans European Aviation
 Skyways of London
 Universal Sky Tours

 Alaska Airlines
 American Airlines
 American Overseas Airlines ♠ (7 x L-049)
 Braniff International Airways
 California Central Airlines
 Capital Airlines
 Central American Airlines
 Chicago and Southern Air Lines ♠
 Delta Air Lines
 Eastern Air Lines ♠ 
 Federal Aviation Administration
 Flying Tiger Line ♠
 Great Lakes Airlines
 Imperial Airlines
 Intercontinent Airways
 Miami Airlines
 Modern Air Transport
 NASA
 National Airlines ♠ (4 x L-1049H)
 Northwest Orient Airlines
 Pacific Air Transport
 Pacific Northern Airlines
 Pan American World Airways ♠
 Paradise Airlines (intrastate carrier in California)
 Regina Cargo Airlines
 Resort Airlines ♠
 Seaboard & Western Airlines  ♠ ( 4 x L-1049D, 5 x L-1049H)
 Seaboard World Airlines
 Slick Airways ♠
 South Pacific Airlines
 Trans World Airlines ♠ (launch operator)
 United States Airways
 Western Airlines
 Wien Air Alaska

 Aerolíneas Uruguayas
 Compañía Aeronáutica Uruguaya (CAUSA)

 Linea Aeropostal Venezolana (LAV) ♠

Military operators

French Air Force

Indian Air Force
Indian Navy

Indonesian Air Force

Israeli Air Force

United States Air Force ♠
United States Navy ♠

Operators
Constellation